Yuzband (also Romanized as Yūzband; also known as Yūzbandeh) is a village in Bozkosh Rural District, in the Central District of Ahar County, East Azerbaijan Province, Iran. At the 2006 census its population was 36 in 9 families.

References 

Populated places in Ahar County